The 1st constituency of Maine-et-Loire (French: Première circonscription de Maine-et-Loire) is a French legislative constituency in the Maine-et-Loire département. Like the other 576 French constituencies, it elects one MP using a two round electoral system.

Description
The 1st Constituency of Maine-et-Loire is situated in the north of the department. It includes the central and some northern portions of the city of Angers along with the more rural cantons of Châteauneuf-sur-Sarthe and Tiercé.

The seat had been a stronghold of the centre right UDR and its successor parties the RPR and the UMP. However, in 2012 the seat was captured by the Socialist Party before falling into the hands of Emmanuel Macron's La République En Marche! in 2017. In 2020, the deputy, Matthieu Orphelin, was one of the LREM deputies who left to form Ecology Democracy Solidarity.

Assembly members

Election results

2022

 
 
 
 
 
 
 
|-
| colspan="8" bgcolor="#E9E9E9"|
|-

2017

 
 
 
 
 
 
 
|-
| colspan="8" bgcolor="#E9E9E9"|
|-

2012

 
 
 
 
 
 
|-
| colspan="8" bgcolor="#E9E9E9"|
|-

References

1